The Natural Park of the Coral Sea, founded in 2014, is a marine park located in New Caledonia, a special collectivity of France. As of 2017 it is the fourth largest protected area in the world, encompassing 1,292,967 square kilometres (499217 sq miles). It includes the UNESCO World Heritage Site The Lagoons of New Caledonia: Reef Diversity and Associated Ecosystems. The possibility granted to the government of New Caledonia to allow cruise ships to circulate there in the future has generated controversy.

See also
List of largest protected areas in the world

References

External links

New Caledonia
Protected areas established in 2014
Marine parks of France
2014 establishments in New Caledonia